Van Sant may refer to:

People
 Gus Van Sant (born 1952), American film director and musician
 Joshua Van Sant (1803–1884), U.S. Representative and Mayor of Baltimore (1871–1875)
 Samuel Rinnah Van Sant (1844–1936), Governor of Minnesota (1901–1905)
 Tom Van Sant (born 1931), American artist
 Peter Van Sant (born 1953), American reporter

Places
 Van Sant Airport, airport in Bucks County, Pennsylvania
 Van Sant Covered Bridge, bridge in Bucks County, Pennsylvania

See also
 Vansant (disambiguation)
 Van Zant (disambiguation)
 Van Zandt (disambiguation)